Nicole Pratt and Mara Santangelo were the defending champions, but chose not to participate that year.

Chan Yung-jan and Chuang Chia-jung won in the final 6–4, 6–4, against Hsieh Su-wei and Vania King.

Seeds

Draw

Draw

External links
Draw

Doubles
Pattaya Women's Open - Doubles
 in women's tennis